The Ambassador of Great Britain to Portugal was the foremost diplomatic representative in Portugal of the Kingdom of Great Britain, created by the Treaty of Union in 1707, in charge of the British diplomatic mission.

For Ambassadors from the Court of St James's to Portugal before 1707 see List of ambassadors of the Kingdom of England to Portugal. For Ambassadors after 1800, see List of Ambassadors from the United Kingdom to Portugal.

Heads of Mission
 1707-1708: Sir Paul Methuen (last English ambassador to Portugal)
 1708-1710: Henri de Massue, Earl of Galway
 1709-1710: Thomas Leffever Chargé d'affaires in absence of Galway>
 1710-1714 George Delaval
 1714-1722: Henry Worsley
 1722–1724: Hon. Thomas Lumley
 1725-1728: Brigadier James Dormer
 1728: Charles Crompton Chargé d'affaires
 1728-1742: Lord Tyrawley
 1742-1745: Charles Crompton (Chargé d'affaires from 1741)
 1745: Abraham Castres Chargé d'affaires
 1745-1749: Sir Benjamin Keene
 1749-1757: Abraham Castres
 1757-1767: Hon. Edward Hay
 1760: Thomas Hay, 9th Earl of Kinnoull Special Mission
 1762: Lord Tyrawley Envoy Plenipotentiary
 1767–1770: William Henry Lyttelton (created Lord Westcote in 1776 and Lord Lyttelton in 1794): Envoy-extraordinary and Plenipotentiary
 1771–1800: Hon. Robert Walpole Envoy Extraordinary and Plenipotentiary
 1786: William Fawkener (jointly with Walpole) for negotiating commercial affairs
 1800: John Hookham Frere (first United Kingdom ambassador to Portugal)

References

Great Britain
Portugal